Horacio Zeballos was the defending champion, but he did not participate this year.

Íñigo Cervantes won the title defeating Nils Langer in the final, 2–6, 7–6(7–3), 6–3.

Seeds

Draw

Finals

Top half

Bottom half

External links
 Main Draw
 Qualifying Draw

References

Marburg Open - Singles
2015 Singles